Green Hills Country Club, located in Millbrae, California, is often referred to as the San Francisco Peninsula’s “hidden gem”.  Green Hills is a private members-only country club located on the San Francisco peninsula approximately 20 minutes south of the city.

Green Hills was originally known as the Union League Golf and Country Club of San Francisco when it was built in 1929, opening to great fanfare in 1930.  The Union League golf course was designed by famed architect Alister MacKenzie, who was responsible for Cypress Point, Augusta National and many others.  The golf course was built upon a  fertile hilly area that was used as nursery land to grow flowers and vegetables.  Flowers grown on the property were used by famed horticulturist John McLaren, to decorate the 1915 Pan Pacific Exhibition, or World's Fair.  

In 1929, when MacKenzie was shaping the land into what is now Green Hills he said “When the Millbrae course is completed it will rank with the first three in the San Francisco district and will be one of the sportiest in the entire state.  The natural topography has made it easy for us to plot the course, and with plenty of water for the tees and fairways, the new club will be one of the finest of its kind on the coast”. 

Green Hills Country Club has hosted a number of prestigious tournaments, including the U.S Open and Senior Open qualifying.  For many decades, the club was host of the annual Professional Baseball Player-Babe Ruth Cancer Fund golf tournament with stars such as Ty Cobb, Bing Crosby, Lefty O'Doul, Leo Durocher and many others.  

Green Hills today is a proud representation of Alister MacKenzie at his finest.  The picturesque golf course has survived the test of time and remains the not so “hidden gem” of Northern California.

In 2007, the original clubhouse was demolished. A new clubhouse opened in 2009.

External links
 homepage

Golf clubs and courses in California
Millbrae, California
Sports venues in San Mateo County, California
Golf clubs and courses designed by Alister MacKenzie
1930 establishments in California